Guiyi (Kweiyi) is a town and the seat of Miluo City in Hunan, China. The town was reformed through the amalgamation of Chengjiao Township and Chengguan Town on December 3, 2015. It is located in the central Miluo City, it is bordered by Quzici Town and Luojiang Town to the north and northeast, Xinshi Town to the southeast, Gupei Town to the southwest, Miluo Town and Heshi Town to the northwest. Through the amalgamation of village-level divisions in 2016, the town has 2 villages and 16 communities. Its seat is Mixin Community.

Administrative divisions

References

Miluo City
Towns of Hunan
County seats in Hunan